Rukmani Kalyanam is a 1936 Indian Tamil-language Hindu mythological film produced and directed by Bhalji Pendharkar. It stars S. Rajam as the Hindu god Krishna and M. S. Vijayal as his wife Rukmani.

Plot

Cast 

Male cast
 Master S. Rajam as Shri Krishna
 R. Duraisamy Raju as Balaraman
 T. R. Mani  as Rukmi
 S. Bala Subramaniam  as Shishupalan
 M. N. M. Sundaram as Naradar
 Joker Ramudu as Subodar
 P. K. Balu as Boatman
 R. D. Raju as Boatman

Female cast
 M. S. Vijayal as Rukmani
 T. S. Meenambal as Chitralekha
 Chellam as Revathi
 Gowri as Friend

Supported by
Mathirimangalam Natesa Iyer, Sreemathi, Panchu Bhagavathar and Kamala.

Production 
Rukmani Kalyanam was produced and directed by Bhalji Pendharkar. S. Rajam, who portrayed the Hindu god Krishna in Sita Kalyanam (1934) and Radha Kalyanam (1935), played the same role in this film, while M. S. Vijayal played his wife Rukmani. Other supporting roles were played by Mathirimangalam Natesa Iyer, Sreemathi, Panchu Bhagavathar and Kamala. The final length of the film was 15,638 feet.

Songs

Reception 
Rukmani Kalyanam was not successful, but film historian Randor Guy, writing for The Hindu, said that it would be remembered for "the appearance of Rajam as Lord Krishna, and the interesting on-screen narration of the epic story by director Balji Phendarkar".

References

External links 
 

1930s Tamil-language films
1936 films
Hindu mythological films
Indian black-and-white films